Sholdan or Shaldan may refer to:
 Shaldan va Baghi, Bushehr Province
 Sholdan, Bushehr
 Sholdan, Qir and Karzin, Fars Province